The men's 50 kilometre classical cross-country skiing competition at the 1994 Winter Olympics in Lillehammer, Norway, was held on 27 February at Birkebeineren Ski Stadium in Lillehammer.

Each skier started at half a minute intervals, skiing the entire 50 kilometre course. The Swede Torgny Mogren was the 1993 World champion and Bjørn Dæhlie was the defending olympic champion from 1992 Olympics in Albertville, France.

Results

References

External links
 Final results (International Ski Federation)

Men's cross-country skiing at the 1994 Winter Olympics
Men's 50 kilometre cross-country skiing at the Winter Olympics